Labeobarbus acuticeps is a species of ray-finned fish in the  family Cyprinidae.
It is found in Burundi, Rwanda, and Tanzania.

Its natural habitats are rivers, freshwater lakes, freshwater marshes, and inland deltas.
It is threatened by habitat loss.

References

acuticeps
Fish described in 1959
Taxa named by Hubert Matthes
Taxonomy articles created by Polbot